Wisk'achani (Aymara wisk'acha a rodent,-ni a suffix, "the one with the viscacha", also spelled Viscachani) is a  mountain in the Bolivian Andes. It is located in the Cochabamba Department, Ayopaya Province, Morochata Municipality. Wisk'achani lies north of the village of Chawpi Suyu (Chaupisuyo).

References 

Mountains of Cochabamba Department